Prothalpia is a genus of false darkling beetles in the family Melandryidae. There are at least four described species in Prothalpia.

Species
These four species belong to the genus Prothalpia:
 Prothalpia holmbergi (Mannerheim, 1852)
 Prothalpia rausuana
 Prothalpia undata LeConte, 1862
 Prothalpia utakoae Sasaji, 1988

References

Further reading

 
 

Melandryidae
Articles created by Qbugbot